K123 or K-123 may refer to:

K-123 (Kansas highway), a state highway in Kansas
HMS Oxlip (K123), a former UK Royal Navy ship